Friedberg Süd station is a railway station in the southern part of Friedberg, located in the Wetteraukreis district in Hesse, Germany.

References

Railway stations in Hesse
Buildings and structures in Wetteraukreis